Jesús de Santesteban (5 November 1866 — ??) was a Basque pianist and composer, son of José Antonio Santesteban, grandson of José Juan Santesteban.

He studied at Conservatoire de Paris. In 1893 he became Officier d'Académie. Composed different salon pieces.

External links 
 Jesús de Santesteban in Enciclopedia Auñamendi

1866 births
Year of death missing
Spanish classical pianists
Male classical pianists
Basque classical composers
Conservatoire de Paris alumni
Spanish male musicians